National Communications Corporation Limited (NATCOM) is a privately held New Zealand company based in Auckland, New Zealand.

NATCOM provides managed fibre Internet services and Internet security products for New Zealand business, and is a developer and supplier of Wi-Fi, internet security and content filtering services.

Founded in 2004 as a network owner and operator with one of NATCOM's early developments, FIVO, a wif-fi hotspot operation was sold to NZX-listed company SmartPay Limited.

Today, NATCOM is a specialist Enterprise Communications Service Provider with its core offering being managed enterprise data via fibre optic networks.  NATCOM continues to provide WiMAX services in Auckland City and offers satellite bandwidth services to rural enterprise.

See also
Telecommunications in New Zealand

References

 National Business Review - NATCOM response to Section 92a Copyright Laws
 Scoop Business News
 National Business Review - NATCOM Satellite Launch

External links 

 

Telecommunications companies of New Zealand
New Zealand companies established in 2004
Telecommunications companies established in 2004